Antonio Rodríguez Martínez (born 17 December 1979), known as Toño, is a Spanish retired footballer who played as a goalkeeper.

He spent most of his professional career with Racing de Santander, appearing in 183 competitive matches over seven seasons. In La Liga, he also represented Granada, Elche and Rayo Vallecano.

Club career
Toño was born in Alicante, Valencian Community. After making his professional debut with hometown club Hércules CF, he joined Recreativo de Huelva (Segunda División) for the 2003–04 season, signing with La Liga side Racing de Santander in January 2005 but returning to Huelva on loan exactly one year later; during both his spells in Andalusia, he had an interesting battle for first-choice status with José Antonio Luque.

In the following years, Toño was the undisputed first-choice: in the 2007–08 campaign, as Racing achieved a first-ever qualification to the UEFA Cup, he finished second to Iker Casillas in the Ricardo Zamora Trophy race, an award which he had already won in his debut season with Recre.

Toño begun 2009–10 as starter. On 28 February 2010, however, he suffered a leg injury as the Cantabrians lost 2–0 at home against UD Almería, and would miss more than two months of action, although he would be reinstated for the final two games as Racing narrowly avoided relegation, including the decisive 2–0 home win against Sporting de Gijón.

After leaving Santander in the summer of 2012, Toño continued competing in the top division by representing Granada CF and Elche CF. On 22 August 2014, he terminated his contract with the latter and moved to fellow league team Rayo Vallecano on 1 September.

In March 2018, the 38-year-old Toño announced his retirement due to recurrent physical problems.

Honours
Recreativo
Segunda División: 2005–06

Individual
Ricardo Zamora Trophy: 2003–04 (Segunda División)

References

External links
Racing Santander official profile 

1979 births
Living people
Spanish footballers
Footballers from Alicante
Association football goalkeepers
La Liga players
Segunda División players
Segunda División B players
Hércules CF B players
Hércules CF players
Recreativo de Huelva players
Racing de Santander players
Granada CF footballers
Elche CF players
Rayo Vallecano players